Vasil Rainčyk, also Vasily Rainchik, is a Belarusian musician and composer and also a professor at the Belarus University of Culture, Minsk, Belarus. He was also the leader of Vierasy, an early Belarusian pop music band. Currently he is director of the State Youth Variety Theater of the Belarus University of Culture. Rainčyk was awarded the honorary title of People's Artist of Belarus.On 20 December 2010, Vasil Rainčyk was among a few Belarusian artists who supported the use of brutal military force against the demonstration of opposition in Minsk. Vasil Rainčyk became known world-wide after these police actions were condemned by European countries and USA. 

He is married to Iryna Ćviatkova.

References

Soviet male composers
Soviet male musicians
Belarusian composers
Place of birth missing (living people)
Belarusian musicians
Soviet songwriters
Belarusian songwriters
Living people
1950 births
20th-century Russian male musicians